The toothbrush moustache is a style of moustache in which the sides are vertical (or nearly vertical) rather than tapered, giving the hairs the appearance of the bristles on a toothbrush that are attached to the nose. It was made famous by such comedians as Charlie Chaplin and Oliver Hardy. The style first became popular in the United States in the late 19th century; from there it spread to Germany and elsewhere, reaching a height of popularity in the interwar years, before becoming unfashionable after World War II due to its strong association with Nazi leader Adolf Hitler. The association has become strong enough that the toothbrush has also become known as the "Hitler moustache".

In the post-war years, the style was worn by some notable individuals, including several Israeli politicians and American real-estate developer Fred Trump. Since the immediate post-war years, it has also appeared in works of popular culture including films, cartoons, and comedy, as well as political imagery—usually eliciting the association with Hitler.

19th century to World War II

In the United States

The toothbrush originally became popular in the late 19th century, in the United States. It was a neat, uniform, low-maintenance style that echoed the standardization and uniformity brought on by industrialization, in contrast to the more flamboyant moustaches typical of the 19th century such as the imperial, walrus, handlebar, horseshoe, and pencil moustaches.

Charlie Chaplin was one of the most famous wearers of the toothbrush moustache, first adopting it in 1914 after his first film, "Making a Living", for his Mack Sennett silent comedies. In a 1933 interview, Chaplin said he added the moustache to his costume because it had a comical appearance and was small enough so as not to hide his expression. Nazi leader Adolf Hitler was a fan of Chaplin films, but according to cultural historian Ron Rosenbaum, "there is no evidence (though some speculation) that Hitler modeled his 'stache on [Chaplin's]". Chaplin took advantage of the noted similarity between his onscreen appearance and that of Hitler in his 1940 film The Great Dictator, where he wore the moustache in a dual role, one of which parodied Hitler.

Comedian Oliver Hardy also adopted the moustache style—using it at least as early as the 1921 film The Lucky Dog. Although Groucho Marx donned a larger moustache, novelty Groucho glasses (marketed as early as the 1940s) often elicit the toothbrush. American film producer Walt Disney is sometimes claimed to have worn the style (1920s–1930s), but his facial hair was a more traditional (i.e. notched) moustache limited to the width of the nose. Another prominent animation producer, Max Fleischer, had a toothbrush moustache.

Clarence D. Martin, the 11th governor of Washington state (1933–1945), donned a toothbrush during his tenure.

In Germany

The style was introduced in Germany in the late 19th century by visiting Americans. Prior to the toothbrush, the most popular style was called the 'Kaiser moustache', perfumed and turned up at the ends, as worn by German emperor Wilhelm II. By 1907, enough Germans were wearing the toothbrush moustache to elicit notice by The New York Times under the headline "'TOOTHBRUSH' MUSTACHE; German Women Resent Its Usurpation of the [Kaiser moustache]". The toothbrush was taken up by German automobile racer and folk hero Hans Koeppen in the famous 1908 New York to Paris Race, cementing its popularity among young gentry. Koeppen was described as "Six-feet in height, slim, and athletic, with a toothbrush mustache characteristic of his class, he looks the ideal type of the young Prussian guardsman." By the end of World War I, even some of the German royals were sporting the toothbrush; Crown Prince Wilhelm can be seen with a toothbrush moustache in a 1918 photograph that shows him about to be sent into exile. German serial killer Peter Kürten (1883–1931) took up the style and eventually reduced it to only the philtrum.

Hitler originally wore the Kaiser moustache, as evidenced by photographs of him as a soldier during World War I. There is no agreement as to what year he first adopted the toothbrush. Alexander Moritz Frey, who served with Hitler during the First World War, claimed that the latter wore the toothbrush style in the trenches after he was ordered to trim his moustache to facilitate the wearing of a gas mask. A 1914 photograph by Heinrich Hoffmann purports to show Hitler with a smaller moustache, but was probably doctored to serve as Nazi propaganda. According to other sources, Hitler did not wear the style until 1919.

Despite the photographic evidence of his much larger moustache during the First World War, Hitler's sister-in-law, Bridget Hitler, said she was responsible for giving Hitler his toothbrush moustache before the war—considered by most scholars to be fiction designed to cash in on Hitler's notoriety. Bridget claimed that Adolf spent a "lost winter" at her home in Liverpool in 1912–13. The two quarreled a lot, mostly, she said, because she could not stand his unruly Kaiser moustache. He cut it, as she says in her memoirs, but that in doing so—as in most things—he went too far.

Anton Drexler, a mentor of Hitler, wore a notched version of the toothbrush. Friedrich Kellner, a Social Democrat who campaigned against Hitler, also wore the style. Many notable Nazis besides Hitler donned it, including Heinrich Himmler, Karl Holz, Ernst Röhm and Hitler's chauffeur Julius Schreck. Additionally, an apparent body double of Hitler was found wearing the style in the aftermath of the dictator's death.

Other places 
The toothbrush was quite popular in the Soviet Union in the early 20th century. A Chaplin-influenced clown named Karandash had a version of it. Many Soviet officers and soldiers wore it up until World War II. In more unique displays, Commander Pavel Dybenko paired the style with his beard and Major General Hazi Aslanov wore a variant covering only the philtrum.

English author George Orwell wore it during the early 1930s. Spanish general Francisco Franco, the dictator of Spain from 1939 to 1975, had a toothbrush throughout the 1930s.

Post–World War II

After World War II, the style fell from favour in much of the world due to its strong association with Hitler, but some notable people continued to wear it. American real-estate developer Fred Trump, the father of former U.S. president Donald Trump, sported it from as early as 1940 until perhaps 1950, although during the war he began concealing his German ancestry. Several politicians of Israel (formed as a state in 1948) flaunted the style, some for much of their careers. Austrian chancellor Julius Raab exhibited it in 1955 while negotiating for restored independence. Hitler's dentist, Hugo Blaschke, wore a similar style—displaying an explicit toothbrush later in life.

The style was utilized in cartoon works as early as 1947, e.g. in Harry Hanan's pantomime comic Louie, which focuses on the everyday trials of a domestic loser. By the 1960s, Osamu Tezuka's Astro Boy manga and the anime series of the same name featured characters with the style, including caricatures of the moustache resembling outgrown nasal hair. The early 1960s American animated sitcom The Jetsons features a character with the style—George Jetson's boss, Cosmo Spacely. Additionally, American comic-book artist Steve Ditko's original design for Spider-Man supporting character J. Jonah Jameson sports a toothbrush moustache, apparently meant to make him seem antagonistic; most subsequent comic and cartoon appearances of the character maintain the style or a variant thereof. Disney comics sporadically feature a minor character with the moustache. The British sitcom On the Buses (1969–1973) features a comedic villain with the style.

Inspired by Chaplin (and disregarding associations with Hitler), keyboardist Ron Mael of the American rock band Sparks maintained a toothbrush moustache throughout most of the 1970s and 1980s. The band received mainstream attention in 1974 with "This Town Ain't Big Enough for Both of Us", popularized via British music television series Top of the Pops. While watching this, John Lennon allegedly phoned his former Beatles bandmate Ringo Starr and referenced the similarity of Mael's appearance to Hitler. The 1982 Sparks song "Moustache" includes the lyrics: "And when I trimmed it very small / My Jewish friends would never call," referencing the association with Hitler and his role in enacting the Holocaust. The band once had a booking to perform on a French television show cancelled due to Mael's moustache. In later years, Mael wore a pencil-variant of the toothbrush.

Former Zimbabwean president Robert Mugabe wore the philtrum-only style from as early as 1976 to as late as 2016.

Between 1985 and 1989, the British children's television drama series Grange Hill featured an authoritarian teacher played by Maurice Bronson (who also portrayed Hitler in several productions) wearing the toothbrush style.

In a 1992 home movie, Nirvana lead singer Kurt Cobain invoked a Hitler moustache (via fake eyelashes) while wearing a dress to mock a pejorative letter to the editor about his wife, Courtney Love. This was featured in the 2015 documentary Cobain: Montage of Heck and shared online to promote the film.

In Mike Judge's 2006 comedy film Idiocracy, the society of a greatly dumbed-down future believes that Charlie Chaplin, not Hitler, led the Nazis. In 2009, English comedian Richard Herring created a stand-up show titled Hitler Moustache in which he wears the facial-hair style in an attempt to "reclaim the toothbrush moustache for comedyit was Chaplin's first, then Hitler ruined it." Herring wore the moustache for about a week, during which time he was anxious about the judgements he thought were being made of him.

In May 2010, American basketball star Michael Jordan appeared in a Hanes commercial sporting a hybrid of the toothbrush and pencil moustache, along with a soul patch. This prompted Jordan's friend Charles Barkley to say, "I don't know what the hell he was thinking and I don't know what Hanes was thinking. I mean it is just stupid. It is just bad, plain and simple."

In 2014, a photograph of Israeli Prime Minister Benjamin Netanyahu and German Chancellor Angela Merkel provoked online amusement due to the former's pointing finger casting a Hitleresque shadow onto the latter's face. Late that same year, Southern All Stars frontman Keisuke Kuwata briefly donned a toothbrush moustache during a televised performance, prompting online speculation as to the reason.

The moustache has come to be a symbol of satire and protest, maligning people in power perceived to be acting like Hitler. In 2021, Amazon changed its app logo following complaints that part of the design, meant to look like a piece of tape sealing a box, resembled a Hitler moustache. Contrarily, some facial-hair media outlets have endorsed the moustache as being appropriate to wear again—especially variations diverging from the strictly rectangular version made famous by Hitler and emphasizing that many other notable individuals brandished it. In an episode of the 2023 animated adult Scooby-Doo spin-off Velma, rain causes one of Fred's fake eyelashes to swim under his nose in a series of unfortunate events making him resemble the Nazi dictator.

Other notable wearers

Nazi Germany

 Karl Maria Demelhuber (image)
 Sepp Dietrich (image)
 Irmfried Eberl (image)
 August Eigruber (image)
 Hermann Esser (image)
 Gottfried Feder (image)
 Edmund Glaise-Horstenau (image)
 Ernst-Robert Grawitz
 Jakob Grimminger
 Erich Koch (image)
 Hans Krebs (image)
 Hinrich Lohse (image)
 Emil Maurice (image)
 Artur Phleps (image)
 Lothar Rendulic (image)
 Gerd von Rundstedt (image)
 Fritz Sauckel (image)
 Otto Skorzeny (image)
 Julius Streicher (image)
 Franz Ritter von Epp (image)
 Christian Wirth (image)
 Kurt Zeitzler (image)

Soviet Union

 Alexander Vasilyevich Alexandrov (image)
 Ivan Bagramyan (image)
 Aleksandr Bezymensky (image)
 Naftaly Frenkel (image)
 Leonid Govorov (image)
 Vladimir Karpov
 Semyon Krivoshein (image)
 Bogdan Kobulov
 Leonid Kubbel (image)
 Grigory Kulik (image)
 Genrikh Lyushkov (image)
 Vasil Mzhavanadze (image)
 Ivan Panfilov (image)
 Roman Ivanovich Panin (image)
 Pavel Rotmistrov (image)
 Minay Shmyryov (image)
 Genrikh Yagoda (image)
 Georgy Zhukov (image)

Israel

 Yitzhak Ben-Aharon (image)
 Eliyahu Dobkin (image)
 Levi Eshkol (image)
 Yitzhak Shamir (image)
 Moshe Sharett (image)
 Zalman Shazar (image)
 Yisrael Yeshayahu (image)

Others

 Siad Barre (image)
 Hulusi Behçet (image)
 Dobri Bozhilov (image)
 Abdalá Bucaram (image)
 Carlos Castillo Armas (image)
 Arthur Compton (image)
 Charles Culley (image)
 Dragiša Cvetković (image)
 Charles de Gaulle (image)
 Immanuvel Devendrar (image)
 Douglas Valder Duff (image)
 Alois Eliáš (image)
 Edward M. Fram (image)
 Milan Gutović (image)
 Sadegh Hedayat (image)
 Paolo Iashvili (image)
 Avetik Isahakyan (image)
 Ahmad Javad (image)
 Gustavo Jiménez (image)
 Amanullah Khan (image)
 Fumimaro Konoe (image)
 Yevhen Konovalets (image)
 Jean-Marie Loret
 Ludwig von Mises
 Frank McGee (image)
 Davud Monshizadeh (image)
 Ihsan Nuri (image)
 Julius Nyerere (image)
 Hermann Obrecht (image)
 Waldemar Pabst (image)
 Wilhelm Pieck
 Marcel Pilet-Golaz (image)
 Abdul Karim Qassem (image)
 Sayyid Qutb (image)
 Ramakrishna Ranga Rao (image)
 Mahmud Salman (image)
 Ferdinand Sauerbruch (image)
 Walter H. Schottky (image)
 Kurt Schuschnigg (image)
 Jean Sibelius
 Bakr Sidqi (image)
 Mehmed Spaho (image)
 Rafael Trujillo (image)
 Georgios Tsolakoglou
 Adolf Windaus (image)
 Yordan Yovkov  (image)
 Szmul Zygielbojm (image)

See also

List of facial hairstyles
Cats That Look Like Hitler

References
Notes

Citations

Adolf Hitler
Charlie Chaplin
Moustache styles
Nazi symbolism